Harold Solomon was the defending champion, but lost in semifinals to Vitas Gerulaitis.

Second-seeded Björn Borg won the title by defeating third-seeded Vitas Gerulaitis 6–5, 5–6, 6–4, 6–5 in the final.

Seeds

Draw

References

External links
 Official results archive (ATP)
 Official results archive (ITF)

1978 Singles